Kana Kanmani was an Indian Malayalam language soap opera premiered on 23 August 2021 aired on Surya TV. It stars Vindhuja Vikraman and Jay Kartik in lead roles along with M. B. Padmakumar, Ann Mathews and Revathi Krishna in supporting roles. It is a remake of Telugu television series Pournami that aired on Gemini TV. The show aired its last episode on 23 July 2022.

Synopsis
Meera, a young woman, vies for the love of her father, who blames her for her mother's death. As a result, she does everything in her power to win him over but faces many challenges.

Cast

Lead
Vindhuja Vikraman as Meera Mahadevan Gautham: Radhika and Mahadevan's daughter; Yamuna's step-daughter; Preethi's half-sister; Gautham's wife. 
Jay Kartik as Gautham Kuberan: Bhagyalakshmi and Kuberan's son; Aparna's cousin; Meera's husband. 
M. B. Padmakumar as Mahadevan: Saraswathy's son; Radhika's widower; Yamuna's husband; Meera and Preethi's father; Swapna's arch-rival.

Recurring
Ann Mathews as Yamuna Mahadevan: Mahadevan's second wife; Preethi's mother; Meera's step-mother. 
Revathi Krishna as Preethi Mahadevan Akin: Mahadevan and Yamuna's daughter; Meera's half-sister; Akin's wife. 
Dr. Aishwarya Warrier / Geetha Nair as Saraswathy: Mahadevan's mother; Meera and Preethi's grandmother.
Priya Prince as Swapna: A crooked businesswoman; Ishana's mother; Akin's aunt; Mahadevan's arch-rival. 
Akin M. A as Akin Madhav: Swapna's nephew; Preethi's husband.
Mahesh as Kuberan: Bhagyalakshmi's husband; Gautham's father. 
Karthika Kannan as Bhagyalakshmi Kuberan: Renu's cousin; Kuberan's wife; Gautham's mother. 
Sreelakshmi Sreekumar as Ishana: Swapna's daughter 
Arjun Syam as Appu: An orphan boy adopted by Gautham and shares a sibling-like bond with him.
Mahima / Sangeetha Sivan as Rajeshwari: Kadambariyamma's younger daughter; Radhika's sister. 
Amboori Jayan as Mani: Domestic help of Puthanmadathil house
Aravind Bhasker as Vivek: Gautham's best friend who supports him in winning Meera's love.
Subhash Nair as Bhargavan: Chitra's uncle
Bindu Murali as Sarojini: Bhargavan's sister; Yamuna's mother; Preethi's grandmother
Gayathri Varsha as Renu: Bhagyalakshmi's cousin; Aparna's mother
Devika S as Aparna: Renu's daughter; Gautam's cousin

Guest
K. R. Vijaya as Puthanmadathil Kadambariyamma: Radhika and Rajeshwari's mother; Meera's grandmother. (2021) (Dead)
Abhirami as Radhika Mahadevan: Kadambariyamma's elder daughter; Rajeshwari's sister; Mahadevan's first wife; Meera's mother. (Dead)
Rahul Ravi as Himself (Episode 53)
Haritha G Nair as Herself (Episode 113)
Dhanya Mary Varghese as Mercy Paul, a famous actress (Mahasangamam episode)
 Arathy Sojan as Kavya, Meera's friend (Mahasangamam episode)
 Reneesha Rahiman as Anjali, Meera's friend (Mahasangamam and wedding episode)
 Vishnu Nair as Adarsh, Kavya's husband (Mahasangamam episode)
 Jayaprakash as Abhijith, Anjali's husband (Mahasangamam and wedding episode)
 Anna Dona as Anupama (Wedding episode)
 Krish Menon as Indrajith (Wedding episode)
 Naveen Arakkal as Rudhra Prakash  Rudhran: Rajeshwari's cousin (Wedding episode)
 Shanavas Shanu as Dinesh IPS, Mahadevan's friend (Wedding episode)

Cross-over episodes
From 15 January 2022 to 18 January 2022 it had a Mahasangamam with Manassinakkare.

Adaptations

References

Surya TV original programming
Malayalam-language television shows